Ball Four is an American sitcom that aired on CBS in 1976. The series is inspired by the 1970 book of the same name by Jim Bouton. Bouton co-created the show with humorist and television critic Marvin Kitman and sportswriter Vic Ziegel. Bouton also starred in the series.

Ball Four followed the Washington Americans, a fictitious minor league baseball team, dealing with the fallout from a series of Sports Illustrated articles written by Americans player Jim Barton (Bouton).
Like the book, the series covered controversial subjects including womanizing players, drug use, homosexuality in sports, and religion.  The series included a gay rookie ballplayer, one of the earliest regular gay characters on television.
The trio began developing the series in 1975, looking to other series like M*A*S*H and All in the Family as models. CBS expressed interest and the creative team developed a script. CBS shot the pilot episode and ultimately bought the series.

Ball Four aired at 8:30 PM Eastern time, which was during the Family Viewing Hour, an FCC-mandated hour of early evening "family-friendly" broadcasting. Consequently, the writers had some trouble with the network's Standards and Practices in their attempt to portray realistic locker room scenes, especially the language used by the players. Pseudo-profanity such as "bullpimp" was disallowed, while "horse-crock" and "bullhorse" were approved.

Ball Four debuted on September 22. While Bouton and other members of the cast received praise for their performances, critics found the series uneven in quality. CBS canceled the show after only five episodes.

Cast
 Jim Bouton as Jim Barton 
 Jack Somack as 'Cap' Capogrosso
 David James Carroll as Bill Westlake 
 Ben Davidson as 'Rhino' Rhinelander 
 Bill McCutcheon as Coach Pinky Pinkney 
 Lenny Schultz as Lenny 'Birdman' Siegel 
 Marco St. John as Rayford Plunkett 
 Jaime Tirelli as Orlando Lopez 
 Samuel E. Wright as C. B. Travis

Episodes

Notes

External links
 

1970s American sitcoms
1976 American television series debuts
1976 American television series endings
American sports television series
1970s American LGBT-related television series
Baseball on television in the United States
Baseball television series
Television shows based on books
CBS original programming
Television shows set in Washington, D.C.
Television series by Warner Bros. Television Studios
American LGBT-related sitcoms